The 2002 North Hertfordshire District Council election was held on 2 May 2002, at the same time as other local elections across England. 18 of the 49 seats on North Hertfordshire District Council were up for election, being the usual third of the council plus a by-election in Royston Heath ward.

Ward Results
The results for each ward were as follows. An asterisk(*) indicates a sitting councillor standing for re-election.

The by-election in Royston Heath was to replace Conservative councillor Rod Kennedy.

References

2002 English local elections
2002